{|
{{Infobox ship image
|Ship image=HMS Äran.jpg
|Ship caption=HMS Äran'
}}

|}

The 'Äran class' was a class of coastal defence ships of the Swedish Navy. The class comprised , Wasa, Tapperheten and Manligheten.

Design

Dimensions and machinery

Armour

Armament
The main armament of the ships where two  single turret guns. Secondary armament included six single  guns and ten  single guns.

ShipsÄran was laid down at the Lindholmens shipyard in Gothenburg and launched in 1902. Wasa was laid down at the Bergsund shipyard in Finnboda and was also launched in 1902. Tapperheten and Manligheten were both laid down at Kockums Shipyard in Malmö and were launched in 1904.

ServiceTapperheten ran aground on rocks near Stockholm in January 1914. The vessel was refloated in July by blasting the rocks out from under her, repaired and returned to service by the end of 1915.

References

 Moore, J: Jane's Fighting Ships of World War I'' (1919; reprinted 1992)

External links
Description of class (1)

Coastal defense ship classes
 
World War II coastal defence ships